Mitch Holleman (born Thomas Mitchell Holleman; September 13, 1994) is an American actor best known as youngest son Jake Hart on the sitcom Reba.

Life and career
Born in Auburn, Alabama, Mitch began begging to be on television at the age of 2. The family moved to Naples, Florida and he was signed to a Miami-based talent agency. By 4, he had done two commercials for Nickelodeon and Burger King. In addition to acting, Mitch enjoys Taekwondo, amusement parks and surfing on his days off.

Aged 4, he took a trip to New York City with his mother, which resulted in numerous commercials and a guest-starring role on The Sopranos. His big break came at age 5 when he landed a series regular role on Daddio. He also had a lead role on the show, Reba. Since then, he has guest-starred on Everybody Loves Raymond and appeared in the films The Animal alongside Rob Schneider, and Bubble Boy alongside Jake Gyllenhaal. He also periodically serves as an on-air reporter for TV Guide Channel. By the age of 9, he had amassed several credits in television and movies. He has also had a voice-over role playing The Duke on Avatar: The Last Airbender. He also guest starred on Disney Channel's Shake It Up.

Since 2019, he has hosted a podcast called Extremely Internet with fellow comedians Kyle Anderson and Gracie Todd. 

He married Emma Elizabeth Holleman in Los Angeles, California on May 16, 2020.

Filmography

Appearances as himself
 In The Mix (2006)
 Hollywood Squares (2003)

External links
 
 Mitch Holleman at the Country Music Television
 Mitch Holleman cast bio on The WB
 Mitch Holleman (TV IV)

1994 births
Male actors from Alabama
Male actors from Florida
American male child actors
American male television actors
Living people
People from Auburn, Alabama